Roy Norris "Buckshot" Jones (born July 23, 1970) is an American racing driver who has competed in NASCAR and sprint cars. He most recently ran in the USAR Hooters Pro Cup Series.

Life and career
Jones earned the nickname "Buckshot" from his grandfather after he ran into a table and showed no signs of pain or agony. His racing career began as a hobby during his studies at the University of Georgia, where he earned a business degree. Jones originally wanted to race motocross, but his dad suggested stock cars since they were safer.

After his sixth race Jones went out to dinner with his father, where he told him that he wanted to be a NASCAR champion. He and his father then developed a six-year plan that would allow Jones to move up the ladder and begin to fulfill his dream.

In 1995, Jones moved to the NASCAR Busch Series with his own team called Buckshot Racing. After a disappointing rookie campaign where his best finish was a ninth at South Boston Speedway, Jones hired Ricky Pearson, son of the legendary David Pearson, as his crew chief. Jones won two races over the next three years, winning the Most Popular Driver award  in 1998. In 1999, after marrying his longtime girlfriend Jina, he made the jump to Winston Cup driving the No. 00 Pontiac, with Ricky's brother Larry Pearson taking over his Busch ride. Crown Fiber Communications was the major sponsor of the car. Jones failed to qualify several times in his rookie year, including the first two races of the season. On the occasions in which he did make the field, a DNF was the typical result. After nine starts, he decided to end his bid for Rookie of the Year and returned to the Busch Series. During his Busch campaign of 2000, he had one pole, three top-tens, and finished 21st in points.

In 2001 he returned to the Cup Series, driving the No. 44 Georgia-Pacific-sponsored Dodge Intrepid for Petty Enterprises. Unfortunately, the season was a struggle. He failed to qualify 5 times and had 10 DNFs, finishing 41st in points with a best result of 16th at Talladega in the spring, and again at Phoenix. Due to a growing family, Buckshot stopped racing full time in April of 2002. After missing the Daytona 500, he was 35th in points after Martinsville, with a top finish of 12th in his home race at Atlanta. He returned for 2 races in 2003, finishing 17th for Phoenix Racing at Daytona in July, and leading 19 laps for Michael Waltrip Racing in a career-best performance at Talladega in September before retiring with damage from a blown tire.

Buckshot has since sold his team and temporarily retired from racing. He last appeared in a NASCAR sanctioned race in 2004, when he ran two Busch Series events. He currently works in land development and real estate in Gwinnett County, Georgia. He returned to auto racing in the Snowball Derby in December 2006 but finished last after being caught in an early accident. In 2007, he returned to racing to drive the No. 00 Chevrolet for DMT Motorsports in the Southern Division of the USAR Hooters Pro Cup Series, but re-retired at the end of the season. In 2015, Jones raced in the third division of the Whelen Modified Tour.

Motorsports career results

NASCAR
(key) (Bold – Pole position awarded by qualifying time. Italics – Pole position earned by points standings or practice time. * – Most laps led.)

Winston Cup Series

Daytona 500

Busch Series

References

External links

1970 births
Living people
NASCAR drivers
NASCAR team owners
People from Monticello, Georgia
Racing drivers from Georgia (U.S. state)
Sportspeople from the Atlanta metropolitan area
Tucker High School alumni
University of Georgia alumni
Michael Waltrip Racing drivers